The 2016 Club Atlético Boca Juniors season was the 87th consecutive Primera División season for the senior squad. During the first part of the 2016, Boca Juniors took part in the Primera División, Supercopa Argentina and the Copa Libertadores.

Season overview

November
Boca played two friendly games, the first one against Puebla F.C. in Mexico losing 1–0 on November 19 and the second one in Resistencia against a team of Liga Chaqueña de fútbol winning 3–2 on November 28.

December
In the first days of December the new uniform was presented: it featured a lighter blue tone. Also, Daniel Angelici won the president elections and will be the chairman until 2019. On December 22 Boca were drawn into Group 3 of the 2016 Copa Libertadores with Bolivian champions Bolívar, Colombian champions Deportivo Cali and a team from the First Stage. On December 29 Jonathan Silva was loaned from Sporting CP of Portugal. In the last days of December Luciano Fabián Monzón and José Pedro Fuenzalida left the club.

January
In the first days of 2016 Leonardo Jara arrived from Estudiantes (LP). Also, Federico Carrizo and Luciano Acosta returned from their loans in Cruz Azul and Estudiantes (LP). Additionally, Nahuel Zárate and Claudio Pérez also returned from their loans in Godoy Cruz and Belgrano, but they will not be taken into consideration by Arruabarrena. Pérez rescinded his contract with Boca. Youth exponents Tomás Pochettino and Franco Cristaldo signed for Defensa y Justicia on an 18-month loan and for Elche CF on a 6-month loan respectively. Daniel Osvaldo was officially presented again in Boca after playing in FC Porto, he signed an 18-month contract with the club. Juan Cruz Komar signed for Talleres (C) on a six-month loan. On January 12 Jonathan Calleri was sold to Deportivo Maldonado and loaned to São Paulo. On January 16, Boca won 3–0 over Emelec in San Juan, but then lost four friendlies including both against River Plate, leaving a bad picture of summer. This led to two new players arrive at the club: Frank Fabra and Juan Manuel Insaurralde.

February
In earlier February, Leandro Marín signed for Tigre on a six-month loan and Lisandro Magallán signed for Defensa y Justicia also on a six-month loan. At the start of the tournament Boca played against Temperley in a 0–0 draw and four days later, lost against San Lorenzo 0–4 in the 2015 Supercopa Argentina. Nahuel Zárate was loaned 18 months to Unión and Luciano Acosta to D.C. United until the end of 2016; also, Federico Bravo was loaned to MLS team New York City FC until the end of 2016. On the second round of Primera División Boca lost against Atlético Tucumán 0–1, playing very bad. After six matches without scoring, Boca managed to win against San Martín (SJ) 1–0 on the third round of Primera División, and against Newell's Old Boys 4–1 in Round 4. On February 24 Boca played the first match of the group stage of Copa Libertadores against Deportivo Cali drawing 0-0. On the round 5 of Primera División Boca lost 0–1 against Racing.

March
Rodolfo Arruabarrena was sacked and is no longer the head coach of Boca; where he won 2 titles and managed 75 games, winning 47, drawing 13 and losing 15. On March 1, Guillermo Barros Schelotto was announced as the new manager, being his third time as manager in a professional football team. He returns to the club after his step as player between 1997 and 2007 where he won 16 titles. In the first match of the new manager, Boca played against Racing in a 0–0 draw on the second round of Copa Libertadores Group Stage. On the Round 6, Boca played against River Plate, the Superclásico, the most important match of Argentina; it was a 0–0 draw. Boca achieved another draw in the group stage of Copa Libertadores, 1–1 in La Paz against Bolívar. On March 14 Boca managed to win 2–1 against Unión. On March 20 Boca lost the match 0–2 against Lanús playing very bad.

April
The first match of April was a 3–0 victory over Atlético de Rafaela. On April 4 the third uniform was presented: it is black with a golden strip. Boca won the first match in Copa Libertadores: 3–1 against Bolívar on the fourth match of the group. On April 10 Boca lost the match 0–2 against Tigre. On April 13 Boca qualified to the final stages of the Copa Libertadores after winning 1–0 in Avellaneda against Racing. In the 11 round Boca won 4–1 against Aldosivi. Boca finished the Group Stage of Copa Libertadores winning 6–2 against Deportivo Cali. The second Superclasico against River Plate was another 0–0 draw. In the first game of the Round of 16 of Copa Libertadores, Boca achieved a great victory 2–1 in Asunción against Cerro Porteño. In the round 13 of the local Tournament Boca lost 1–0 against Argentinos Juniors, playing with an alternative team.

May
In the second leg of the Round of 16 of Copa Libertadores, Boca won 3–1 against Cerro Porteño and advanced to the Quarterfinals. In the round 14 of the local tournament Boca played against Huracán in a 0–0 draw. In the first leg of the Copa Libertadores Quarterfinals played on May 12, Boca tied 1–1 in Montevideo against Nacional. On May 15, Boca played against Estudiantes (LP) and lost 3–1. On May 19 Boca advanced to the Semifinals of the Copa Libertadores after beating Nacional in the Penalty shoot-out. Boca played the last match of the local tournament and the season: it was a 0–0 draw against Defensa y Justicia.

Current squad

Last updated on May 22, 2016

Transfers

Pre-season and friendlies

Competitions

Overall

1: There is a one-month break between the quarterfinals and semifinals due to the Copa América Centenario held in June, so the Semifinals belong to the next season.

Overview

Primera División

League table

Relegation table

Results summary

Results by round

Matches

Supercopa Argentina

Copa Libertadores

Group stage

Final Stages

Round of 16

Quarterfinals

Team statistics

Season Appearances and goals

Last updated on May 22, 2016

|-
! colspan="12" style="background:#dcdcdc; text-align:center"| Goalkeepers

|-
! colspan="12" style="background:#dcdcdc; text-align:center"| Defenders

 
|-
! colspan="12" style="background:#dcdcdc; text-align:center"| Midfielders

 

|-
! colspan="12" style="background:#dcdcdc; text-align:center"| Forwards

|}

Top scorers
Last updated on May 22, 2016

Top assists
Last updated on May 22, 2016

Penalties

Clean sheets
Last updated on May 22, 2016

Disciplinary record
Last updated on May 22, 2016

References

External links
 Club Atlético Boca Juniors official web site 

Club Atlético Boca Juniors seasons
Argentine football clubs 2016 season